A phytoestrogen is a  plant-derived xenoestrogen (see estrogen) not generated within the endocrine system, but consumed by eating plants or manufactured foods. Also called a "dietary estrogen", it is a diverse group of naturally occurring  nonsteroidal plant compounds that, because of its structural similarity with estradiol (17-β-estradiol), have the ability to cause estrogenic or antiestrogenic effects. Phytoestrogens are not essential nutrients because their absence from the diet does not cause a disease, nor are they known to participate in any normal biological function. Common foods containing phytoestrogens are soy protein, beans, oats, barley, rice, coffee, apples, carrots (see Food Sources section below for bigger list).

Its name comes from the Greek phyto ("plant") and estrogen, the hormone which gives fertility to female mammals. The word "estrus" (Greek οίστρος) means "sexual desire", and "gene" (Greek γόνο) is "to generate". It has been hypothesized that plants use a phytoestrogen as part of their natural defense against the overpopulation of herbivore animals by controlling female fertility.

The similarities, at molecular level, of an estrogen and a phytoestrogen allow them to mildly mimic and sometimes act as an antagonist of estrogen. Phytoestrogens were first observed in 1926, but it was unknown if they could have any effect in human or animal metabolism. In the 1940s and early 1950s, it was noticed that some pastures of subterranean clover and red clover (phytoestrogen-rich plants) had adverse effects on the fecundity of grazing sheep.

Structure 

Phytoestrogens mainly belong to a large group of substituted natural phenolic compounds: the coumestans, prenylflavonoids and isoflavones are three of the most active in estrogenic effects in this class. The best-researched are isoflavones, which are commonly found in soy and red clover. Lignans have also been identified as phytoestrogens, although they are not flavonoids. Mycoestrogens have similar structures and effects, but are not components of plants; these are mold metabolites of Fusarium, especially common on cereal grains, but also occurring elsewhere, e.g. on various forages. Although mycoestrogens are rarely taken into account in discussions about phytoestrogens, these are the compounds that initially generated the interest on the topic.

Mechanism of action 
Phytoestrogens exert their effects primarily through binding to estrogen receptors (ER).  There are two variants of the estrogen receptor, alpha (ER-α) and beta (ER-β) and many phytoestrogens display somewhat higher affinity for ER-β compared to ER-α.

The key structural elements that enable phytoestrogens to bind with high affinity to estrogen receptors and display estradiol-like effects are:
 The phenolic ring that is indispensable for binding to estrogen receptor
 The ring of isoflavones mimicking a ring of estrogens at the receptors binding site
 Low molecular weight similar to estrogens (MW=272)
 Distance between two hydroxyl groups at the isoflavones nucleus similar to that occurring in estradiol
 Optimal hydroxylation pattern

In addition to interaction with ERs, phytoestrogens may also modulate the concentration of endogenous estrogens by binding or inactivating some enzymes, and may affect the bioavailability of sex hormones by depressing or stimulating the synthesis of sex hormone-binding globulin (SHBG).

Emerging evidence shows that some phytoestrogens bind to and transactivate peroxisome proliferator-activated receptors (PPARs). In vitro studies show an activation of PPARs at concentrations above 1 μM, which is higher than the activation level of ERs. At the concentration below 1 μM, activation of ERs may play a dominant role. At higher concentrations (>1 μM), both ERs and PPARs are activated. Studies have shown that both ERs and PPARs influence each other and therefore induce differential effects in a dose-dependent way. The final biological effects of genistein are determined by the balance among these pleiotrophic actions.

Ecology 
These compounds in plants are an important part of their defense system, mainly against fungi.

Phytoestrogens are ancient naturally occurring substances, and as dietary phytochemicals they are considered as co-evolutive with mammals. In the human diet, phytoestrogens are not the only source of exogenous estrogens. Xenoestrogens (novel, man-made), are found as food additives and ingredients, and also in cosmetics, plastics, and insecticides.  Environmentally, they have similar effects as phytoestrogens, making it difficult to clearly separate the action of these two kind of agents in studies done on populations.

Avian studies
The consumption of plants with unusual content of phytoestrogens, under drought conditions, has been shown to decrease fertility in quail. Parrot food as available in nature has shown only weak estrogenic activity. Studies have been conducted on screening methods for environmental estrogens present in manufactured supplementary food, with the purpose of aiding reproduction of endangered species.

Food sources 

According to one study of nine common phytoestrogens in a Western diet, foods with the highest relative phytoestrogen content were nuts and oilseeds, followed by soy products, cereals and breads, legumes, meat products, and other processed foods that may contain soy, vegetables, fruits, alcoholic, and nonalcoholic beverages. Flax seed and other oilseeds contained the highest total phytoestrogen content, followed by soybeans and tofu. The highest concentrations of isoflavones are found in soybeans and soybean products followed by legumes, whereas lignans are the primary source of phytoestrogens found in nuts and oilseeds (e.g. flax) and also found in cereals, legumes, fruits and vegetables. Phytoestrogen content varies in different foods, and may vary significantly within the same group of foods (e.g. soy beverages, tofu) depending on processing mechanisms and type of soybean used. Legumes (in particular soybeans), whole grain cereals, and some seeds are high in phytoestrogens.

A more comprehensive list of foods known to contain phytoestrogens includes:

 Soybeans and soy products
 Tempeh
 Linseed (flax)
 Sesame seeds
 Wheat berries
 Fenugreek (contains diosgenin, but also used to make Testofen, a compound taken by men to increase testosterone).
 Oats
 Barley
 Beans
 Lentils
 Yams
 Rice
 Alfalfa
 Mung beans
 Apples
 Carrots
 Pomegranates
 Wheat germ
 Rice bran
 Lupin
 Kudzu
 Coffee
 Licorice root
 Mint
 Ginseng
 Hops,
 Bourbon whiskey
 Beer,
 Fennel
 Anise.
 Red clover (sometimes a constituent of green manure).
 Spinach

Food content of phytoestrogens is very variable and accurate estimates of intake therefore difficult and depends on the databases used.  Data from the European Prospective Investigation into Cancer and Nutrition found intakes between 1 mg/d in Mediterranean Countries and more than 20 mg/d in the United Kingdom. The high intake in the UK is partly explained by the use of soy in the Chorleywood bread process. An epidemiological study of women in the United States found that the dietary intake of phytoestrogens in healthy post-menopausal Caucasian women is less than one milligram daily.

Effects on humans 

In humans, phytoestrogens are readily absorbed into the circulatory system, circulate in plasma, and are excreted in the urine. Metabolic influence is different from that of grazing animals due to the differences between ruminant versus monogastric digestive systems.

As of 2017, there is insufficient clinical evidence to determine if phytoestrogens have effects in humans.

Females 

It is unclear if phytoestrogens have any effect on the cause or prevention of cancer in females. Some epidemiological studies have suggested a protective effect against breast cancer. Other epidemiological studies found that consumption of soy estrogens is safe for patients with breast cancer, and that it may decrease mortality and recurrence rates. It remains unclear if phytoestrogens can minimize some of the deleterious effects of low estrogen levels (hypoestrogenism) resulting from oophorectomy, menopause, or other causes. A Cochrane review of the use of phytoestrogens to relieve the vasomotor symptoms of menopause (hot flashes) stated that there was no conclusive evidence to suggest any benefit to their use, although genistein effects should be further investigated.

Males 

It is unclear if phytoestrogens have any effect on male sexuality, with conflicting results about the potential effects of isoflavones originating from soy. Some studies showed that isoflavone supplementation had a positive effect on sperm concentration, count, or motility, and increased ejaculate volume. Sperm count decline and increasing rate of testicular cancers in the West may be linked to a higher presence of isoflavone phytoestrogens in the diet while in utero, but such a link has not been definitively proven. Furthermore, while there is some evidence that phytoestrogens may affect male fertility, more recent reviews of available studies found no link, and instead suggests that healthier diets such as the Mediterranean diet might have a positive effect on male fertility. Neither isoflavones nor soy have been shown to affect male reproductive hormones.

Infant formula 

Some studies have found that some concentrations of isoflavones may have effects on intestinal cells. At low doses, genistein acted as a weak estrogen and stimulated cell growth; at high doses, it inhibited proliferation and altered cell cycle dynamics. This biphasic response correlates with how genistein is thought to exert its effects.
Some reviews express the opinion that more research is needed to answer the question of what effect phytoestrogens may have on infants, but their authors did not find any adverse effects. Studies conclude there are no adverse effects in human growth, development, or reproduction as a result of the consumption of soy-based infant formula compared to conventional cow-milk formula. The American Academy of Pediatrics states: "although isolated soy protein-based formulas may be used to provide nutrition for normal growth and development, there are few indications for their use in place of cow milk-based formula. These indications include (a) for infants with galactosemia and hereditary lactase deficiency (rare) and (b) in situations in which a vegetarian diet is preferred."

Ethnopharmacology

In some countries, phytoestrogenic plants have been used for centuries in the treatment of menstrual and menopausal problems, as well as for fertility problems. Plants used that have been shown to contain phytoestrogens include Pueraria mirifica and its close relative kudzu, Angelica, fennel, and anise.
In a rigorous study, the use of one such source of phytoestrogen, red clover, has been shown to be safe, but ineffective in relieving menopausal symptoms (black cohosh is also used for menopausal symptoms, but does not contain phytoestrogens).

See also 

 Ethnopharmacology
 Isoflavones
 Lignan
 Mycoestrogens
 Phytoandrogens
 Plant hormone
 Soy

References 

Phytoestrogens
Phytochemicals
Endocrinology
Estrogens
Nutrients
Nutrition
Endocrine disruptors